Yazan Abdallah Ayed Al-Naimat (born 4 June 1999) is a Jordanian professional footballer who plays as a forward for Al Ahli in the Qatar Stars League. He represents the Jordan national team.

International career
Al-Naimat debuted for the Jordan national team in a 2–0 friendly win over Tajikistan on 1 February 2021.

International goals

Honours
Individual
FIFA Arab Cup Bronze Boot: 2021

References

External links
 
 

1997 births
Living people
Sportspeople from Amman
Jordanian footballers
Jordan international footballers
Jordan youth international footballers
Association football forwards
Jordanian Pro League players
Qatar Stars League players
Sahab SC players
Al Ahli SC (Doha) players
Expatriate footballers in Qatar
Jordanian expatriate sportspeople in Qatar